Katarina Mina Louise "Nina" Jobst-Smith (born 30 August 2001) is a German-Canadian ice hockey player and member of the German national ice hockey team, currently playing college ice hockey with the Minnesota Duluth Bulldogs women's ice hockey program in the Western Collegiate Hockey Association (WCHA) conference of the NCAA Division I. As a teen, she played in the German Women's Ice Hockey League (DFEL) with ECDC Memmingen.

Jobst-Smith represented Germany at the IIHF Women's World Championships in 2021 and 2022.

References

External links 
 

2001 births
Living people
Canadian women's ice hockey defencemen
German women's ice hockey defencemen
Ice hockey people from British Columbia
Minnesota Duluth Bulldogs women's ice hockey players
Sportspeople from North Vancouver